The Lubbock Renegades were an expansion member of the AF2. The team played its home games at the City Bank Coliseum, which was the former home of the IFL/NIFL team, the Lubbock Lone Stars/Gunslingers. The team was owned by Doug McGregor, Rick Dykes, and Bart Reagor. It was coached by former Texas Tech wide receiver Rodney Blackshear. On September 9, 2008, it was announced that the Renegades were ceasing operations.

Results by season

|-   
|2007 || 7 || 9 || 0 || 4th NC Central || --
|-
|2008 || 9 || 7 || 0 || 3rd NC Central || Lost NC Round 1 (Bossier-Shreveport)
|-
!Totals || 16 || 17 || 0
|colspan="2"| (including playoffs)
|}

2008 schedule

References

External links
 Official Website
 Lubbock Renegades at ArenaFan
   

Defunct af2 teams
R
American football teams in Texas
Defunct American football teams in Texas
American football teams established in 2006
American football teams disestablished in 2008
Arena Football League in Texas
2006 establishments in Texas
2008 disestablishments in Texas